KONG (channel 16) is an independent television station licensed to Everett, Washington, United States, serving the Seattle area. It is owned by Tegna Inc. alongside NBC affiliate KING-TV (channel 5). Both stations share studios at the Home Plate Center in the SoDo district of Seattle, while KONG's transmitter is located in the city's Queen Anne neighborhood.

History
The KONG-TV call sign was first granted by the Federal Communications Commission (FCC) on April 6, 1984. When it was applied for, it immediately drew a legal complaint from King Broadcasting, then-owner of KING-TV, against Carl Washington's KONG TV, Inc., the first broadcaster to apply for a license for Everett's channel 16. The station had planned to go on the air on June 1 of that year, with studios in Everett and an advertising sales office in Seattle, but kept getting bogged down by years of legal challenges from residents on Cougar Mountain who objected to the electromagnetic radiation from an additional broadcaster. After the legal challenges to the transmitter, KONG lay dormant until broadcasters came up with innovative ways to program additional stations in their area.

KONG-TV signed on the air on July 8, 1997. It was locally owned, but managed by KING-TV (which had just been acquired by Belo) through a local marketing agreement. The KONG call letters were retained as a tongue-in-cheek reference to King Kong, which made both stations easily marketable together. Belo bought channel 16 outright in 2000, when the FCC began to permit television station duopolies. On June 13, 2013, the Gannett Company announced that it would acquire Belo. The sale was completed on December 23.

On June 29, 2015, the Gannett Company split in two, with one side specializing in print media and the other side specializing in broadcast and digital media. KING and KONG were retained by the latter company, named Tegna.

Programming 
Initially, the station ran a general entertainment format with classic sitcoms, westerns, old movies, cartoons, and a 10 p.m. newscast. Along with the newscast and KING's Evening Magazine, the station now airs KING-TV's syndicated shows (such as Dr. Phil) during prime time or other time slots, giving viewers a second chance to watch the shows that day. It also carries a few syndicated programs that KING-TV does not air such as Inside Edition, Extra, and Access Hollywood. KONG also broadcasts certain NBC network programs in lieu of KING, including a repeat of Meet the Press in its traditional mid-morning time slot, as KING is one of the few West Coast NBC affiliates to carry it live from Washington, D.C. at 6:00 a.m. Pacific Time, instead of tape-delaying it to 9:00 a.m. Pacific Time as is custom.

Because of its relationship with KING, KONG can air NBC programming that may get displaced by other programming such as local events or extended breaking news coverage. Occasionally, KONG can even air live breaking news events—whether from NBC News or KING 5—when KING 5 airs local programming (i.e. New Day Northwest, KING 5 News at Noon, etc.) and NBC's Olympic coverage and when situation warrants; although KING 5 and KONG simulcast NBC's breaking news coverage during morning news programs as well as in the middle of regular programming, especially whenever there is breaking news of a national or global matter. An example of this is when in 2006, 2007, 2008 and 2009, KONG aired NBC's coverage of the Stanley Cup Finals for games that occurred on the East Coast, with KING airing local programming and news in its place and ceding that more viewers usually watched CBC's NHL coverage on the network's Vancouver owned-and-operated station CBUT. For the 2008 and 2012 NFL preseasons, Seattle Seahawks preseason football games that were not televised nationally aired on KONG as NBC held the rights to the Summer Olympic Games. KONG also aired Seattle Sounders FC games, and airs the weekly magazine program Sounders FC Weekly on Sunday nights during the Major League Soccer season.

In 2017, after KIRO-TV discontinued its 31-year-old tradition of full-day coverage of the H1 Unlimited Seafair Cup, full-day coverage of the races moved to KONG the next year in association with SWX Right Now.

Newscasts

KING-TV produces 26 hours of news programming (with five hours each weekday and 30 minutes each on Saturdays and Sundays) for KONG. KONG broadcasts a 10 p.m. newscast which competes with an in-house hour-long newscast on Fox owned-and-operated station KCPQ; the program airs for one hour on Monday through Friday evenings and a half-hour on weekend evenings. KONG also broadcasts a two-hour extension of KING's weekday morning newscast starting at 7 a.m., which also competes with KCPQ's morning newscast. KONG also broadcasts an hour-delayed rebroadcast of KING's noon newscast at 1 p.m. weekdays. It's the only newscast shown on KONG that comes from the main sister channel, KING. On September 9, 2013, KONG added a weeknight 9 p.m. newscast from KING, becoming the second newscast to air at that timeslot in the Seattle market (after KCPQ added a weeknight 9 p.m. newscast in 2011 on KZJO while keeping the 10 p.m. newscast on KCPQ), resulting in Seattle's first two-hour continuous prime time news block.

Technical information

Subchannels
The station's ATSC 1.0 channels are carried on the multiplexed digital signals of other Seattle television stations:

Analog-to-digital conversion
KONG shut down its analog signal, over UHF channel 16, on June 12, 2009, as part of the federally mandated transition from analog to digital television. The station's digital signal remained on its pre-transition UHF channel 31, using PSIP to display KONG's virtual channel as 16 on digital television receivers.

In 2009, KONG became one of the first four television stations in the country to begin broadcasting mobile DTV signals. The OMVC chose KONG and KOMO-TV in Seattle and WPXA-TV and WATL in Atlanta as the stations to beta test the ATSC-M/H standard, which has since been officially adopted for free-to-air broadcast television with clear reception on mobile devices, overcoming many of the defects of the original ATSC standard.

ATSC 3.0

See also
Channel 6 branded TV stations in the United States
Channel 16 virtual TV stations in the United States
Channel 31 digital TV stations in the United States

References

External links 
KING5.com - Official KING/KONG-TV website

ONG (TV)
Tegna Inc.
Independent television stations in the United States
Television channels and stations established in 1997
1997 establishments in Washington (state)
Everett, Washington
Major League Soccer over-the-air television broadcasters
Former Gannett subsidiaries
ATSC 3.0 television stations